Ferenc Siák (born 24 January 1933) is a Hungarian diver. He competed in two events at the 1956 Summer Olympics.

References

External links
 

1933 births
Living people
Hungarian male divers
Olympic divers of Hungary
Divers at the 1956 Summer Olympics
Divers from Budapest
Sportspeople from Budapest